Marco Pašalić (born 14 September 2000) is a professional footballer who plays as a forward for Borussia Dortmund II. Born in Germany, he represented Croatia internationally at under-17 level.

Career statistics

Club

Notes

References

External links
 

2000 births
Living people
Footballers from Karlsruhe
German people of Croatian descent
Croatian footballers
German footballers
Association football forwards
Croatia youth international footballers
Regionalliga players
3. Liga players
VfB Stuttgart II players
Borussia Dortmund II players
Borussia Dortmund players
Croatian expatriate footballers
Croatian expatriate sportspeople in Germany
Expatriate footballers in Germany